Taxi! Taxi! is a 1927 American silent comedy film directed by Melville W. Brown and written by Melville W. Brown and Raymond Cannon. It is based on the 1925 short story of the same name by George Weston that was originally serialized in The Saturday Evening Post magazine. The film stars Edward Everett Horton, Marian Nixon, Burr McIntosh, and Edward Martindel. The film was released on April 24, 1927 by Universal Pictures under their 'Jewel' banner.

Plot
Peter Whitby, who works as a draftsman in a large architectural firm, is commissioned to meet Rose, the niece of Zimmerman, president of the company, at the station. The girl is favorably impressed by Peter and asks to have him as a companion on her tour of the city. The two go to eat at a restaurant where Rose's uncle had forbidden her to go. At the club, Zimmerman is having a meeting with Parmalee, a wealthy businessman. Rose and Peter, in order not to be seen by their uncle, leave, however, arousing the suspicions of an investigator. Unable to find a taxi, Peter buys one, ignoring that it is the "white taxi", a car used in some robberies and murders. Zimmerman wants to send Rose home, while Peter tries to fetch the girl. Pursued by the police, by Zimmerman and Parmalee, the two young men manage to get to a justice of the peace who marries them while, in the meantime, the real criminals of the "white taxi" are arrested.

Cast
Edward Everett Horton as Peter Whitby
Marian Nixon as Rose Zimmerman
Burr McIntosh as Grant Zimmerman
Edward Martindel as David Parmalee
William V. Mong as Nosey Ricketts
Lucien Littlefield as Billy Wallace
Freeman Wood as Jersey
Helen Ferguson as Undetermined Secondary Role (uncredited)

Preservation
The film is now considered lost.

References

External links

1927 comedy films
1927 films
Silent American comedy films
American silent feature films
American black-and-white films
Universal Pictures films
Lost American films
Films directed by Melville W. Brown
1927 lost films
Lost comedy films
1920s American films